is a Japanese former Nippon Professional Baseball pitcher.

References 

1968 births
Living people
Baseball people from Hiroshima Prefecture 
Japanese baseball players
Nippon Professional Baseball pitchers
Yakult Swallows players
Kintetsu Buffaloes players
Fukuoka Daiei Hawks players